Walter Horatio Westbrook (21 November 1827 – 3 January 1897), was an Australian cricketer, who played two first-class cricket matches for Tasmania.

He has the distinction of having played in the first ever first-class cricket match in Australia.

Walter Westbrook died on 3 January 1897 in Launceston, Tasmania at the age of 69.

External links

1827 births
1897 deaths
Australian cricketers
Tasmania cricketers